Phi Gamma Delta, commonly known as Fiji, is a social fraternity with more than 144 active chapters and 10 colonies across the United States and Canada. It was founded at Jefferson College, Pennsylvania, in 1848. Along with Phi Kappa Psi, Phi Gamma Delta forms a half of the Jefferson Duo. Since its founding in 1848, the fraternity has initiated more than 196,000 brothers. The nickname FIJI is used commonly by the fraternity due to Phi Gamma Delta bylaws that limit the use of the Greek letters.

Founding

The organization was founded on April 22, 1848, at Jefferson College in Canonsburg, Pennsylvania. Six college students gathered in a dormitory room (known by the students as "Fort Armstrong") to establish a secret society.  The society they formed was initially called "The Delta Association".  The founders, referred to by members as the "Immortal Six", were John Templeton McCarty, Samuel Beatty Wilson, James Elliott Jr., Ellis Bailey Gregg, Daniel Webster Crofts, and Naaman Fletcher.

The first regular meeting of Phi Gamma Delta and the adoption of the Fraternity's Constitution took place on May 1, 1848.  Consequently, May 1 was chosen to be "Founder's Day" at the 43rd Convention held in 1891 and has traditionally been celebrated as the founding date of the Fraternity.

Contrary to popular belief, the Immortal six were not Freemasons when they entered Jefferson College.

Beliefs
Phi Gamma Delta has chosen not to use the term alumni for members who have graduated; post collegiate members are referred to as Graduate Brothers, to imply that membership extends past the undergraduate experience. Similarly, one of the mottoes used by the organization is, "Not For College Days Alone".

Phi Gamma Delta's mission statement lists five core values for its members: friendship, knowledge, service, morality, and excellence. In addition, members are encouraged to live by three priorities by these respective order: scholarship, fraternity, and self. This ordering is because members attend university with the foremost goal of receiving an education, and that Phi Gamma Delta is a fraternity that promotes scholastic achievement amongst its members.

Practices and customs

Use of Greek letters and etymology of "Fiji"
Phi Gamma Delta limits the written display of its Greek letters.  In accordance with the fraternity's international bylaws, Fiji chapters and members only inscribe their letters in the following seven locations:

 On a uniform diamond-shaped member badge
 On memorials to deceased brothers
 On the Fraternity's official flag
 On the Fraternity's official seal
 On a chapter house marker
 On a brother's official college ring
 On a brother's certificate of membership

The fraternity instructs its members to consider the letters sacred and to never display them on an object that can be easily destroyed.  Whereas other fraternities often display their letters on clothing or other items, this tradition prevents Fijis from doing so.  In place of the actual Greek letters, "Fiji," "Phi Gam," or the English spelling "Phi Gamma Delta" is used in their place.

The Fiji nickname started at New York University as a suggested name for the Fraternity magazine (Fee Gee). It was officially adopted by the national fraternity at the 1894 convention in the belief that the term would be distinctive and appeal to the imagination.  Prior to its formal appropriation by the organization at large, nicknames for members of the fraternity varied greatly; ranging from "Phi Gamm" and "Delta" by brothers across the nation, "Fee Gee" in New York, and "Gammas" in the South. As of now though, "Fiji" and "Phi Gam" are considered by the fraternity to be the only appropriate nicknames for Phi Gamma Delta members on the international scale, though local nicknames related to a chapter's Greek name or other colloquialisms do exist.

Organization
The fraternity is composed of chapters of two types.  Most chapters serve primarily undergraduate students and are established at a single college or university .  There are also chapters to serve members of the fraternity who have graduated from college and are established to serve a city or larger region.  The chapters are governed by the fraternity's international headquarters in Lexington, Kentucky.

Honors and awards
Each year the Phi Gamma Delta organization gives out a number of awards, both to chapters, and to individual members.

Pig Dinner
The Frank Norris Pig Dinner is an annual graduate dinner held by all Phi Gamma Delta chapters. The dinner is named for author Frank Norris, a member of the Fiji chapter at the University of California, Berkeley where the first Pig Dinner was held in 1893. Pig Dinner is sanctioned by the International Fraternity and it serves to welcome graduate brothers back to their undergraduate chapters.

It is the longest continually running, chapter-based, annual Graduate event in the world of fraternities and sororities.

The International Fraternity stores a list of annual Pig Dinners.

Fiji Islander
Affectionately built upon the "Fiji" nickname, many chapters hold an annual "Fiji Islander" party. These are typically large festivities with tropical themes often using banana and palm trees as decoration, although they can vary widely from chapter to chapter. Some are large parties where alcohol, sand and tropical foliage are present, others may be alcohol free, and some Fiji Islander events are charity projects rather than parties.

Fiji Man
The fraternity once used a mascot named "Fiji Man," a thick-lipped, dark-skinned man in a grass skirt, sometimes holding a spear or with a bone in his nose, in the style of a once-common stereotype of a Pacific Islander. Fraternity members built large sculptures of this racist caricature as a party decoration. The Phi Gamma Delta national organization has since banned Fiji Man, and now prohibits appearing in blackface at fraternity events.

Controversy

The appearance of "Fiji Man", Phi Gamma Delta's historical racist mascot, caused complaints from the 1970s to 1990s.

A Fiji Man snow sculpture at Colgate University in 1979 and a t-shirt depicting Fiji man at the University of Texas in 1989 both caused campus-wide apprehension about racism. A "slave auction" with Fiji Man decorations at the University of Southern California in 1989 resulted in mandatory diversity training for the fraternity members. The women who conducted the training characterized it as not one of her more successful efforts.

In 1987 the Phi Gamma Delta chapter at University of Wisconsin–Madison was suspended twice for racism. In May it was closed because of Fiji Island party featuring a large caricature of a Pacific Islander with a bone through his nose. Eight days after it was reinstated the chapter was closed again because Phi Gamma Delta members entered Zeta Beta Tau, a majority-Jewish fraternity, where they began shoving and punching people. Two Fiji members were charged with battery.

In 1990 Phi Gamma Delta members at the University of Texas in Austin handed out t-shirts with a racist Little Black Sambo drawing during a basketball tournament. 500 students protested outside the fraternity house after the incident.

Local chapter or member misconduct

Indiana

A federal lawsuit filed by a student at Butler University in 2019 describes being raped by a Wabash College Phi Gamma Delta member while she was black-out drunk during a Phi Gamma Delta party. She told her attacker to stop and attempted to escape while blacking out repeatedly. Other Phi Gamma Delta fraternity members tried to block the woman's friends from finding her as she was being raped, according to the lawsuit. She says that Crawfordsville, Indiana police told her Wabash College has no formal code of conduct and that the student who assaulted her would face few consequences, so encouraged her not to pursue the complaint.

Iowa

On August 30, 2021, an online petition alleged a sexual assault at the University of Iowa Phi Gamma Delta chapter, said to have occurred about one year prior. The allegation appeared a few days after a reported assault at the Nebraska chapter, where students protested in front of the Phi Gamma Delta house.

Nebraska

In September 2012, University of Nebraska at Lincoln (UNL) campus police fielded a report of a rape at the Phi Gamma Delta fraternity house.

On January 21, 2017, Phi Gamma Delta fraternity members at UNL were claimed to have screamed pro-rape slurs at participants of the 2017 Women's March. Chants of "no means yes, yes means anal" were allegedly aimed at thousands of women, children, and men walking past the fraternity house on the University of Nebraska campus. Fraternity members were accused on social media of waving Donald Trump signs and screaming, "grab them by the pussy," and then announcing which marchers they would and would not want to "grab by the pussy". Multiple protesters have said that they heard the fraternity members chanting, which a spokesperson for the fraternity has denied. One week later, a protest was held outside the fraternity's chapter-house. The protest was attended by about 50 people, include an antifa group which flung tampons dipped in red paint at the building. The fraternity was suspended from UNL from March 2017 to May 2020 because of "a pattern of sexually harassing conduct" and other patterns of misconduct.

The UNL chapter was accused of sexual misconduct in October 2019, while it was still suspended because of the events of 2017.

A sexual assault was reported to University of Nebraska police on August 24, 2021, as having been committed by a Phi Gamma Delta member. Hundreds of protesters converged on the fraternity house that night, calling for an end to rape on campus and for the Phi Gamma Delta fraternity to be shut down. Fraternity members stayed inside the house, and shared a video via the internet of them laughing at the protestors out the window. The next day, chancellor Ronnie Green announced that the university would be closing the fraternity house and suspending the chapter while the allegation of sexual assault were investigated.

Campus protests against Phi Gamma Delta continued through the next week. State senator Megan Hunt spoke at one, confirming that although she did not attend UNL, she was aware of the "open secret" of frequent sexual assault at Phi Gamma Delta and certain other UNL fraternities. During the week of protests, university police received an influx of reports of rape; many were previously unreported events from years ago.

In October 2021 the UNL chapter of Phi Gamma Delta was suspended until 2026. The suspension was because of alcohol use, and not officially connected to the recent protests or ongoing sexual assault investigation.

Tennessee

A member at the University of Tennessee was accused of drugging and raping two women during a party in 2019. The accused apologized to one of the women in a text message, which was later used as evidence of his guilt. The fraternity house was sanctioned.

Hazing allegations

In 1997, as part of an allegedly mandatory hazing event at the Massachusetts Institute of Technology chapter, 18-year-old freshman Scott Krueger died as a result of excessive alcohol consumption. Manslaughter charges were brought against the Phi Gamma Delta organization itself, rather than any individuals. In response, the chapter dissolved and the case was suspended. MIT later settled with Krueger's family for 4.75 million dollars.

In 1999 a 19-year-old pledge was tackled and taken to the Phi Gamma Delta house at the University of Nebraska where he was handcuffed and forced to drink 15 shots of brandy and whisky and three to six cans of beer over two and a half hours. He broke loose from the handcuffs and attempted to escape by sliding down a drainpipe from a third story window. He fell and suffered head injuries. The incident lead to the Nebraska Legislature making hazing a crime. In a resulting lawsuit, the Nebraska Supreme Court ruled that the university should have taken more steps to protect the student, as the university was aware of a pattern of hazing, sexual assault, and other problems at the Phi Gamma Delta house.

In 2006, 19 year old Danny Daniels was found dead in the Phi Gamma Delta fraternity house at Fresno State University, prompting an investigation and immediate suspension of the chapter. It was found out that the fraternity hosted a large party the night before, and that members forced Daniels to drink large amounts of alcohol for initiation. Once he became sick, a few FIJI brothers carried him to a secluded room at the fraternity and left him. Daniels died in the early morning of January 8, 2006 from acute alcohol intoxication and later tests showed that Daniels had a blood-alcohol level of 0.34, more than four times the legal limit. The university suspended the chapter for 5 years and as of 2019, they are still inactive.

On September 17, 2010, a prospective member (pledge), Matt Fritzie, was partially paralyzed after diving into a shallow pool during a Fiji Islander party in Lawrence, Kansas. In response to the incident, the University of Kansas placed the chapter on a two-year probation for hazing.  Fritzie has since sued both the chapter and the national organization.

In 2012, West Virginia University banned the fraternity in response to alcohol related hazing. The fraternity reinstated the chapter in 2014.

On April 4, 2014, Michael Evan Anderson, member of the University of Arizona chapter of FIJI died after an unsanctioned FIJI event, after falling  from the top of an air conditioning unit onto the roof of his dormitory. The investigation of his death by the University Police led to an investigation from the Dean of Students Office which included several counts of hazing, including kicking new members in the stomach, new members cleaning the house before and after parties and performing personal acts of servitude to members.

In 2015, five members of the fraternity at the University of Alabama were arrested after an investigation into hazing of their pledges. Per a legitimate anonymous source, fraternity members required pledges to stand in buckets of ice and salt, resulting in severe injuries.

In 2017, the fraternity at the University of Nebraska at Lincoln was suspended by the university until 2020 for reckless alcohol use, hazing pledges and inappropriate sexually based behavior, including a pattern of sexually harassing conduct.

Police at the University of Missouri - Columbia were alerted to an unresponsive freshman, Daniel Santulli, brought to a local hospital by members after a fraternity party in 2021. Lawsuits are in process, and two of the members have been charged with felonies. One lawsuit states Santulli’s "skin was pale and his lips were blue, yet no one called 911." Instead, "the decision was made to drive Santulli to University Hospital in Columbia in one of the brother’s cars." It was also alleged that "this was not just an alcohol overdose, but was hazing on a pledge during their 'dad reveal'." The university announced it would no longer recognize Phi Gamma Delta as a student organization because of multiple violations of its standard of conduct.

In 2021, the fraternity at the University of Missouri had their recognition as an officially registered student organization on campus withdrawn due to multiple violations of the university's standard of conduct.

In 2022, the fraternity at Bowling Green State University was suspended after an investigation by the university revealed hazing and underage drinking by the group.

In 2022, the chapter at University of Kansas was suspended for several years due to extreme verbal, emotional, and physical abuse of pledges. One pledge reported to authorities his entire pledge class was "under the control and authority of members every waking minute each day" during the fall 2021 semester.

Founding of Kappa Alpha Theta
Fijis at the Lambda chapter at Indiana Asbury University (now known as DePauw University) played an important role in the founding of Kappa Alpha Theta women's fraternity.  Bettie Locke, the sister of George W. Locke (DePauw, 1871), was one of the first women enrolled at DePauw. Bettie had many Fiji friends and one of them asked her to wear his badge. She contended that she would do so only if she knew the secrets behind the letters. The fraternity, after debate, declined to initiate her. So, upon suggestion of her father, Dr. John Wesley Locke, a Beta Theta Pi, she formed Kappa Alpha Theta with Alice Allen, Bettie Tipton and Hannah Fitch; four of the small number of women enrolled at DePauw at the time. Kappa Alpha Theta was founded on January 27, 1870. Phi Gamma Delta later presented Bettie Locke with an engraved silver cake basket as a token of friendship.

Notable Fijis

Chapters and colonies

See also
List of social fraternities and sororities

References

External links
Phi Gamma Delta Fraternity official website

 
Student organizations established in 1848
International student societies
North American Interfraternity Conference
Fraternities and sororities in the United States
1848 establishments in Pennsylvania